Smalltown America (STA) was a UK-based independent record label formed in 2001. Staff are currently based in London and Derry, and the label has a stated aim of "cultivating a productive staff of music lovers and a self-sustainable business model, through which artists can release the best records they can possibly produce."

Originally set up by Jetplane Landing as the platform for their releases, the label has now released numerous albums by other acts, as well as nine Public Service Broadcast compilation CDs.

The closure of the label was announced by founder Andrew Ferris on 24 November 2020.

Roster

Current
Alan MX
Axis Of
Blacklisters
Burning Alms 
Feldberg
Illness
Jetplane Landing
LaFaro
More Than Conquerors
Skibunny
Sullivan & Gold
The Light Sleepers
The Young Playthings
This Town Needs Guns
We Versus the Shark

Past
And So I Watch You From Afar
Oppenheimer
Fickle Public
Fighting With Wire
An Emergency
USA Nails

As well as this, around 150 artists have seen their music released on the Public Service Broadcast compilation CD series and more recently showcased on the offshoot Public Service Blogcast weekly audioblog.

See also
 List of record labels 
 List of independent UK record labels

External links
 SmalltownAmerica.co.uk – official site
 Jetplane Landing official site 

British independent record labels
Indie rock record labels